XHNOS-FM is a radio station on 97.5 FM in Nogales, Sonora. The station is owned by Radios Kino, S.A. de C.V. and has been silent since May 2013 due to strike action.

History
XHNOS began with a concession awarded to Radios Kino on March 4, 1993.

At 3pm on May 29, 2013, the workers of XHNOS went on strike. The employees, backed by Mexico's broadcasting labor union STIRT, allege that they have not received pay or benefits. The strike has not been resolved as of October 2015.

References

Radio stations in Sonora